AR-A000002 is a drug which is one of the first compounds developed to act as a selective antagonist for the serotonin receptor 5-HT1B, with approximately 10x selectivity for 5-HT1B over the closely related 5-HT1D receptor. It has been shown to produce sustained increases in levels of serotonin in the brain, and has anxiolytic effects in animal studies.

References 

5-HT1B antagonists
4-Morpholinyl compunds
Benzamides
Phenylpiperazines
Aminotetralins